Thornborough is a village in Hambleton District of North Yorkshire, England. Thornborough is in the West Tanfield parish. The Thornborough Henges ancient monuments are situated south and west of the village. The village lies just to the south of the B6267 road, which connects the A6055 in the east, with the A6108 road at Masham. The village is served by two buses a day in each direction between Ripon and Masham. When the Masham Branch of the North Eastern Railway was open,  station would have been the nearest railway station to Thornborough.

The village is not mentioned in the Domesday Book, and the first recorded use of Thornborough was in 1198 as Thornbergh, meaning Thorn Hill. The second part of the name Beorg, derives from Old Norse and is found in other place names such as Barby, Barrowby and Borrowby. It is thought that this led to the Old English Beorg, which means Barrow. The village was previously in the Wapentakes of Hang East and Hallikeld. Today, as part of the parish of West Tanfield, its population is recorded with that parish returns for the 2011 census.

A small cidermaking venture (Thornborough Cider) is based in the village which uses apples only from Yorkshire. The cider has been in production since 2010, and in 2016, the company  planted their own  orchard in the village. Thornborough Cider have won many awards for the quality of their product.

References

External links

Layout of the village

Villages in North Yorkshire
Wensleydale